Anaqut (also, Anagyut, until 2003, Danaqırt, and Danagyrt) is a village and municipality in the Ordubad District of Nakhchivan, Azerbaijan. It is located in the near of the Ordubad-Unus highway, 26 km away from the district center. The Venend river flows through center of the village. Its population mainly is busy with gardening, vegetable-growing and animal husbandry. There are club, library and a medical center in the village. It has a population of 428.

Monuments 
There was an Armenian church in the village - St. Astvatsatsin Church. It was still standing in the 1980s and had been destroyed by February 2000.

See also 
 St. Astvatsatsin Church (Anaqut)

References

External links 

Populated places in Ordubad District